Helophilus fasciatus (Walker, 1849), the narrow-headed marsh fly, is an abundant species of syrphid fly observed throughout the United States and Canada. Hoverflies can remain nearly motionless in flight. The adults are also known as flower flies for they are commonly found on flowers, from which they get both energy-giving nectar and protein-rich pollen. The larvae of this genus are associated with wet decaying organic material, particularly accumulations of decaying vegetation in ponds and mud and farmyard manure or silage. The adults of this species lays eggs on vegetation overhanging water. The larvae hatch and drop into the water.

References

External links

Eristalinae
Articles created by Qbugbot
Insects described in 1849
Taxa named by Francis Walker (entomologist)
Hoverflies of North America